Vladimir Benediktovich Nosik is a Soviet and Russian actor, Honored Artist of Russia (1993), People's Artist of Russia (2016).

Older brother —  People's Artist of Russia Valery Nosik, daughter —  actress Ekaterina Nosik.

Selected filmography
Crime and Punishment (1970) as   tavern servant
This Merry Planet (Эта весёлая планета, 1973) as Valerik
Earthly Love (Любовь земная, 1975) as  Yurka 
When September Comes (Когда наступает сентябрь, 1976) as   locksmith Gena
Say a Word for the Poor Hussar (О бедном гусаре замолвите слово, 1981) as cornet Simpomponchik 
Guest from the Future (Гостья из будущего, 1985) as old man Pavel 
Dangerous for Your Life! (Опасно для жизни!, 1985) as Maxim Dmitriev 
The Most Charming and Attractive (Самая обаятельная и привлекательная, 1985) as Gena Sysoev 
How to Become Happy (Как стать счастливым, 1986) as fellow of the Brain Institute
Lilac Ball (Лиловый шар, 1987) as  Uuu-Uuu-Uuh the magician 
All Costs Paid (За всё заплачено, 1988) as  Dusya 
Two arrows. Stone Age Detective (Две стрелы. Детектив каменного века, 1989) as Long-haired
Entrance to the Labyrinth (Вход в лабиринт, 1989) as Spirkin

References

External links

1948 births
Living people
Male actors from Moscow
Soviet male actors
Russian male actors
Honored Artists of the Russian Federation
People's Artists of Russia
Gerasimov Institute of Cinematography alumni